Mueang Ratchaburi is the capital district (amphoe mueang) of Ratchaburi province, western Thailand.  the population of the district was 122,747.

History
The history of the area can be dated back to the Dvaravati town, Khu Bua, just a few kilometres south of the modern town of Ratchaburi. After being deserted for about 300 years, the town was reestablished near  by King U-Thong of the Ayutthaya Kingdom. In 1817 the town centre was moved to the opposite bank of the Mae Klong River.

The district was one of the five original districts of Monthon Ratchaburi that were established in 1895 with Phraya Surinthararuchai (Thet Bunnag) as the first superintendent commissioner. At first the provincial administration was in Photharam District, but was moved to tambon Na Mueang in 1898.

Geography
Neighboring districts are (from the north clockwise) Photharam and Damnoen Saduak of Ratchaburi Province, Bang Khonthi of Samut Songkhram province, Wat Phleng, Pak Tho, and Chom Bueng of Ratchaburi.

The main river of the district is the Mae Klong.

Economy
Hin Kong Subdistrict will be the site of a 1,400 MW gas-fired power plant operated by SET-listed Ratch Group PLC. Construction will commence in 2021. The first block of 700 MW will come online in 2024 and the second 700 MW block in 2025. The Energy Regulatory Commission (ERC) approved the plant, which will cost US$700 million (21.7 billion baht), in 2019. Ratch signed a 25-year power purchase agreement with state-run Electricity Generating Authority of Thailand (EGAT), which owns a 45% stake in Ratch.

Administration
The district is divided into 22 sub-districts (tambons), which are further subdivided into 187 villages (muban). The town (thesaban mueang) Ratchaburi covers the complete tambon Na Mueang. The township (thesaban tambon) Khao Ngu covers parts of tambons Chedi Hak and Ko Phlapphla. Lak Mueang covers Khok Mo, Phong Sawai, Huai Chinsi and all of Ang Thong. There are a further 18 tambon administrative organizations (TAO).

Environment
Since at least 2001, villagers of tambon Nam Pu have complained about toxic wastewater from an industrial waste treatment plant they suspected of contaminating their water. Wax Garbage Recycle Centre, an industrial waste treatment plant, began its operation in the upstream area of Nam Pu Creek about the same time as contamination became evident. The pollution spread to tambon Rang Bua of Chom Bueng district. Responding to complaints, the Thai Pollution Control Department tested creek water and groundwater. It found that levels of heavy metals (lead, nickel, and barium) exceeded their standards. They also found high levels of volatile organic compounds (VOC) such as toluene, xylene, ethylbenzene, benzene, 1,1,2-trichloromethane and Cis-1,2-dichloroethylene. The Department of Industrial Works and Ratchaburi's Industry Office, since 2002, have sent 19 letters ordering the plant to improve its operation, and at least six orders for the plant to shut down parts of its facility. Despite efforts by the authorities, the plant is still in operation and toxic wastewater contamination continues unabated.

References

Mueang Ratchaburi